Makat, also known as Maqat (Maqat, ماقات; , Makat) is a town in Atyrau Region, west Kazakhstan. It has a population of 14,082.

References

Atyrau Region
Cities and towns in Kazakhstan